The State House is the official residence of the president of the Gambia. It was built in colonial days and was the residence of the governor of the Gambia. Then known as the Government House, it became the residence of the Governor General following Independence before republic status was attained.

According to a false claim by the former president, Yahya Jammeh, the British did not build the state house.

See also
Government Houses of Africa
Government Houses of the British Empire
Governors General of the Gambia

References

Presidential residences
Official residences in the Gambia
Government Houses of the British Empire and Commonwealth
Gambia Colony and Protectorate